Johannes Schettel (born 4 April 1959 in Olsberg, North Rhine-Westphalia) is a West German luger who competed in the late 1980s. He won the bronze medal in the men's singles event at the 1989 FIL World Luge Championships in Winterberg, West Germany.

He also won a complete set of medals at the FIL European Luge Championships with a gold in the mixed team event (1988), a silver in the mixed team event (1990), and a bronze in the men's singles event (1988). Schettel also finished seventh in the men's singles event at the 1988 Winter Olympics in Calgary.

His best overall Luge World Cup finish was second in men's singles in 1985-6. He retired in 1989 and is running a sporting goods store in Germany with his wife Claudia.

References

External links
Hickok sports information on World champions in luge and skeleton.
Information on Schettel's sporting goods. 
Italian National Olympic Committee (CONI) results on top eight finishers in men's singles luge: 1964-2002 
List of European luge champions 
List of men's singles luge World Cup champions since 1978.

1959 births
Living people
People from Hochsauerlandkreis
Sportspeople from Arnsberg (region)
German male lugers
Lugers at the 1984 Winter Olympics
Lugers at the 1988 Winter Olympics
Olympic lugers of West Germany
20th-century German people